Joaquim Vieira Ferreira Levy (born February 17, 1961) is a Brazilian economist and Brazil's former Finance Minister. Levy took office on January 1, 2015, during the presidential inauguration of Dilma Rousseff's second term. He also was president of the Brazilian Development Bank (BNDES).

Prior to the appointment, Levy was the President of Bradesco Asset Management, a division of Bradesco, Brazil's second largest private bank.

Life and education
Born in Rio de Janeiro, Brazil, Levy holds a PhD in economics from the University of Chicago (1992), a Master's in economics from Getúlio Vargas Foundation (FGV) (1987) and graduated in Naval Architecture and Marine Engineering from the Federal University of Rio de Janeiro.

Career

Early career
Levy was a professor of economics at FGV in the 1990s, before joining the IMF, where he worked from 1992 to 1999. At the IMF Levy held several positions in the Western Hemisphere Department (1992), Europe I Department (1993-1997), Capital Markets, and Research (1997-1998). Levy was also vice-president at the Inter-American Development Bank and Finance Secretary of the State of Rio de Janeiro, during the first administration of Governor Sérgio Cabral Filho.

Between 1999 and 2000, Levy was a visiting economist at the European Central Bank, having worked in the division of Capital Markets and Monetary Strategy.

In 2000 Levy was appointed Deputy Secretary of Economic Policy at Brazil's Ministry of Finance, and in 2001 became Chief Economist at Brazil's Ministry of Planning, Budget, and Management. In January 2003, he was appointed Treasury Secretary (an officer that in Brazil serves under the Minister of Finance) by president Luiz Inácio Lula da Silva, an office he held until 2006. He helped Brazil obtain its investment grade credit rating by checking spending and overhauling its debt structure.

From 2007 to 2010 Levy served as Finance Secretary of the State of Rio de Janeiro, under Governor Sérgio Cabral.

Career in the private sector
From 2010 to November 2014, Levy was the President of Bradesco Asset Management, an asset arm of the Brazilian giant financial conglomerate Bradesco, with more than US$130 billion under management. Levy left Bradesco at the invitation from Dilma Rousseff to assume the Ministry of Finance.

Minister of Finance, 2014–2015
On November 27, 2014, president Dilma Rousseff named Levy as the country's Finance Minister for her second term, replacing Guido Mantega. Levy took office as Finance Minister on January 1, 2015.

World Bank, 2016–2018
On January 11, 2016, World Bank Group president Jim Yong Kim named Levy as the bank's Chief Financial Officer, replacing Bertrand Badre. Levy's appointment at the World Bank Group was effective February 1, 2016. As Former managing director and World Bank Group Chief Financial Officer , Joaquim Levy was responsible for the financial and risk management strategies of the World Bank Group and for the institutions that make up the Group. This includes development of new, innovative financial products and services, oversight of the financial reporting, risk management, and mobilization of financial resources in alignment with the Group's strategy.

Brazilian Development Bank, 2018–2019
In November 2018, it was announced that Levy was chosen by the team of President-elect Jair Bolsonaro to become the next president of the Brazilian Development Bank (BNDES). On 16 June 2019, Levy left the presidency of the bank after a controversy between President Bolsonaro and the nominee for director of the bank's Capital Market, Marcos Barbosa Pinto, who was Chief of Staff of Demian Fiocca, former president of BNDES during the government of former President Lula.

Other activities
In June 2021, Levy was appointed to the World Bank–International Monetary Fund High-Level Advisory Group (HLAG) on Sustainable and Inclusive Recovery and Growth, co-chaired by Mari Pangestu, Ceyla Pazarbasioglu, and Nicholas Stern.

References

External links

 
  Bradesco Asset Management website

|-

1961 births
20th-century Brazilian economists
21st-century Brazilian economists
Federal University of Rio de Janeiro alumni
Finance Ministers of Brazil
Living people
People from Rio de Janeiro (city)
University of Chicago alumni